Aintab plateau or Gaziantep plateau is a low, gently undulating plateau that forms the westernmost part of the Southeastern Anatolia Region in Turkey. It forms the northwestern end of the Arabian Plate where it meets the Anatolian Plate at the East Anatolian Fault. The plateau lies in the Turkish provinces of Gaziantep, Kilis, and Adıyaman. In Classical Antiquity, this was the region of Commagene. Gaziantep (Aintab) is located nearly in the south-center of the plateau.

Borders and description
The average elevation of the Aintab plateau is 400–600 m in the south and 600–700 m in the northern Adıyaman Province. The plateau forms the northernmost part of the Syria geographic region. Aintab plateau is a continuation of Aleppo plateau; Aleppo plateau slopes upward gently in a southeast-northwest direction and then it rises forming the Aintab plateau approximately midway between Aleppo and Gaziantep. Mount Kurd, Mount Simeon, and Mount ʻAqīl are extensions of Aintab plateau into Aleppo plateau.

Aintab plateau is bounded from the east by the valley of River Euphrates and the Manbij plain, and from the north by the Taurus Mountains. The Maraş Triple Junction forms the western boundary—a valley that runs from Maraş to Antakya separating between the Nur Mountains and Sof (Qarṭal) Mountains.  The river ʼAswad (Kara-su) runs in the southern half of the valley.

Aintab plateau slopes up in south-north and southeast-northwest direction. The eastern part of the plateau is occupied by the vast plains of Tall Bashar (Oğuzeli), Yavuzeli, and Araban in Gaziantep Province. The western part holds the Sof mountain (1,496 m) and Karadağ mountain (1,081 m).

The Alleben and Sajur rivers rise from Sof Mountain and flow southeast to the Euphrates across the plain of Tall Bashar. The Nizip Stream rises from Nizip and joins the Euphrates near the city. The Merzimen (Bozatlı) river rises from Sof Mountain and flows through the southern part of Yavuzeli plain and joins the Euphrates. The Kara-su runs through the Araban Plain and also joins the Euphrates. River Afrin rises from the Sof Mountain and flows south in the west of the plateau. River Quweiq used to rise from the southern Aintab plateau.

In the northern Adıyaman Province, the southern terrain along the Euphrates consists of highlands separated by rivers flowing down from the foothills of the steep Taurus Mountains into the Euphrates. These rivers include the Kahta, Göksu, Sofras, and Ziyaret rivers. The plains in this portion of the plateau make only 10% of the total area. They are usually situated along the rivers and lie in average between 600–700 m above sea level. The most important plains are the Adıyaman and Kahta plains. The foothills of the Taurus Mountains dominate the northern portion of Adıyaman Province. These are known as the Malatya mountains, and they increase towards the north. The highest peaks of the Malatya mountains are the Akdag (2552 m), Dibek (2549 m), Tucak (2533 m), Gorduk (2206 m), Nemrut (2150 m), Borik (2110 m), Bozdag (1200 m), and Karadag (1115 m).

Forests are scarce on the Aintab plateau. The main trees are pine and oak.

Plateaus of Turkey
Southeastern Anatolia Region
Landforms of Gaziantep Province
Landforms of Kilis Province
Landforms of Adıyaman Province
Physiographic provinces